The 2021 season for  was the team's ninth season as a UCI WorldTeam and its 17th overall. After four years with Dutch travel agency and tour operator Sunweb as the team's title sponsor, Dutch health and materials company DSM took over as the title sponsor.

Team roster 

Riders who joined the team for the 2021 season

Riders who left the team during or after the 2020 season

Season victories

Notes

References

External links 

 

Team DSM men
2021
Team DSM men